The following quarterbacks and running backs have totaled at least 1,000 rushing yards in a Canadian Football League season.

Gary Allen
Kelvin Anderson
John Avery
Nub Beamer
Roy Bell
Eric Blount
Cory Boyd
Johnny Bright
Blaise Bryant
Ed Buchanan
Willie Burden
Wes Cates
Lovell Coleman
Jon Cornish
Darren Davis
Troy Davis
Robert Drummond
Monroe Eley
Jim Evenson
Gill Fenerty
Willie Fleming
Jim Germany
Cookie Gilchrist
Tracy Ham
Andrew Harris
Lou Harris
Mack Herron
Gerry James
Michael Jenkins
Kerry Joseph
Kenton Keith
Larry Key
Norman Kwong
Leo Lewis
Earl Lunsford
Hugh McKinnis
Martell Mallett
Tim McCray
Bob McNamara
Jerome Messam
William Miller
Sean Millington
Troy Mills
Robert Mimbs
Johnny Musso
Doyle Orange
Martin Patton
Cory Philpot
Mike Pringle
Dave Raimey
Josh Ranek
Willard Reaves
George Reed
Fred Reid
Joffrey Reynolds
Mike Richardson
Charles Roberts
Jamal Robertson
Mike Saunders
Kory Sheets
Charlie Shepard
Chad Simpson
Joe Smith
Tony Stewart
Mike Strickland
Tyrell Sutton
Bob Swift
James Sykes
Bill Symons
Reggie Taylor
Jim Thomas
Jon Volpe
Antonio Warren
Jim Washington
Howard Waugh
Brandon Whitaker
Arkee Whitlock
Ronald Williams

Canadian Football League players
Rush